The following lists events that happened during 1913 in Chile.

Incumbents
President of Chile: Ramón Barros Luco

Events

May
25 May – The Deportes Santa Cruz football club is founded.

November
27 November – South American dreadnought race: The Chilean battleship Almirante Latorre is launched.

Births
16 February – Raúl Sáez (d. 1992)
4 April – Braulio Arenas (d. 1988)
3 August – Ignacio Cruzat (d. 1977)
23 August – Rodrigo Flores (d. 2007)
25 September – Carlos Muñoz Pizarro (d. 1976)
27 October – Jorge Guerra (d. 2003)
31 December – René Schneider (d. 1970)

Deaths 
9 February – José Antonio Gandarillas (b. 1839)

References 

 
Years of the 20th century in Chile
Chile